Jacob Berab, also spelled Berav or Bei-Rav, known as Mahari Beirav (1474 – April 3, 1546), was an influential rabbi and talmudist best known for his attempt to reintroduce classical semikhah (ordination).

Biography
Berab was born at Maqueda near Toledo, Castilian Spain in 1474. He later became a pupil of Isaac Aboab. After the expulsion of Jews from Spain, he fled to Fez. The Fez Jewish community, consisting of 5,000 families, chose him for their rabbi, though he was but a youth of eighteen. From there he went to Tlemçen, then the chief town of the Barbary states. There, the Jewish community consisting of 5,000 families, chose him for their rabbi, though he was but a youth of eighteen. Evidence of the great respect there paid him is afforded by the following lines of Abraham Gavison: "Say not that the lamp of the Law no longer in Israel burneth! Jacob Berab hath come back—once more among us he sojourneth!"

It is not known how long Berab remained in Algeria; but before 1522 he was in Jerusalem. There, however, the social and economic conditions were so oppressive that he did not stay long, but went with his pupils to Egypt. Several years later (1527) Berab, now fairly well-to-do, resided in Damascus; in 1533 he became rabbi at Cairo; and several years after he seems to have finally settled in Safed, which then contained the largest Jewish community in Ottoman Syria. It was there that Berab conceived the bold idea which made him famous, that of establishing a central spiritual Jewish power.

Plan for ordination
Berab had a plan for the reintroduction of the old "Semichah" (rabbinic ordination). It is likely that his further plans included the reestablishment of the sanhedrin. Berab's model was the sanhedrin of tannaitic times which consisted of men who could trace their ordination back to Moses; yet for more than a thousand years no such men had existed, and the rabbinic ordination (Semichah) was lost.

According to Louis Ginzberg, Berab's undertaking was part of a larger Messianic vision. In this period, Ginsburg says, "...the imaginative and sentimental persons thought that the promised Messianic time was approaching; they regarded their great sufferings as the process of purgation, as the חבלי משיח, the eschatologic "birth-throes," of the Messianic era". These hopes "afforded the right person an excellent opportunity to create for the Jews a recognized central authority, spiritual—and perhaps, in time, political—in character. There is no doubt that the man for the purpose was Berab; he was the most important and honored Talmudist in the Orient, and was endowed with perseverance amounting to obstinacy."

According to others, the purpose of Berab's plan was a resolution of certain halachic difficulties. In particular, there was a problem of Marranos returning to the Jewish faith, and in order to free them from divine punishment some Rabbis of the Land of Israel considered applying to them the punishment of makkot, which can only be assigned by Sanhedrin. Jacob Berab writes about this problem in his Responsa.

Maimonides taught that if the sages in Eretz Israel would agree to ordain one of themselves, they could do so, and that the man of their choice could then ordain others. Although Maimonides' opinion had been opposed by Nahmanides and others, the scholars at Safed had confidence in Berab, and had no doubt that, from a rabbinical standpoint, no objection to his plan could be raised.

Ordination of 1538
In 1538, twenty-five rabbis met in assembly at Safed and ordained Berab, giving him the right to ordain any number of others, who would then form a Sanhedrin. In a discourse in the synagogue at Safed, Berab defended the legality of his ordination from a Talmudic standpoint, and showed the nature of the rights conferred upon him. On hearing of this event most of the other Jewish scholars expressed their agreement, and the few who discountenanced the innovation lacked the courage to oppose Berab and his following.

Berab then ordained a few other rabbis, including the chief Rabbi of Jerusalem Levi ibn Habib, rabbi Joseph Caro, rabbi Moses of Trani, and rabbi Yosef Sagis. Joseph Caro later ordained rabbi Moshe Alshich, and Alshich ordained rabbi Hayim Vital around 1590.

Dispute with Ibn Habib
To obtain the good-will of the Jews of the Holy City, the first use that Berab made of his new dignity was to ordain the chief rabbi at Jerusalem, Levi ibn Habib. Since the latter had for many years been a personal opponent of Berab, and the two had had many disputes in regard to rabbinical decisions and approbations, Berab's ordination of Ibn Habib shows that he placed general above personal interests. Moreover, the terms in which Berab officially announced Ibn Habib's ordination were kindly ones. Berab, therefore, expected no opposition from that quarter; but he was mistaken. Ibn Habib's personal animus was not appeased, but rather stimulated, by his ordination. He considered it an insult to his dignity and to the dignity of Jerusalem that so important a change should be effected without consultation of the Jerusalem scholars. He did not content himself with an oral protest, but sent a communication to the scholars of Safed, in which he set forth the illegality of their proceeding and declared that the innovation involved a risk to rabbinical Judaism, since the Sanhedrin might use its sovereign authority to tamper with the calendar.

Although Levi ibn Habib's tone was moderate, every one could read between the lines that he opposed the man Berab as well as his work. An illustration of this is afforded by the remarks made by Ibn Habib when he maintained at length that the scholars of Safed were not qualified to ordain, since they were not unprejudiced in the matter, and when he hinted that Berab was not worthy to transmit ordination. Berab was surprised by the peril in which his undertaking was now placed; and, embittered by Ibn Habib's personal attacks, he could not adhere to a merely objective refutation, but indulged in personalities. In answer to Ibn Habib's observation, that a sacred ordination must not proceed from learning alone, but from holiness also, Berab replied: "I never changed my name: in the midst of want and despair I went in God's way"; thereby alluding to the fact that, when a youth, Ibn Habib had lived for a year in Portugal as a Christian under an assumed name.

The strife between Berab and Ibn Habib now became wholly personal, and this had a bad effect on the plan; for Berab had many admirers but few friends. Moreover, Berab's life was endangered. The ordination had been represented to the Turkish authorities as the first step toward the restoration of the Jewish state, and, since Berab was rich, the Turkish officials would have showed him scant mercy in order to lay hands on his wealth. Berab was forced to go to Egypt for a while, but though each moment's delay might have cost him his life, he tarried long enough to ordain four rabbis, so that during his absence they might continue to exercise the function of ordination. In the meantime Ibn Habib's following increased; and when Berab returned, he found his plan to be hopeless. His death some years later put an end to the dispute which had gradually arrayed most of the Jewish scholars in hostile lines on the question of ordination.

It is known positively that Joseph Caro and Moses of Trani were two of the four men ordained by Berab. If the other two were Abraham Shalom and Israel ben Meir di Curiel, then Caro was the only one who used his privilege to ordain another, Moses Alshich, who, in turn, ordained Hayim Vital. Thus ordination might be traced for four generations.

With the exception of some short contributions to the works of others, the only one of Berab's numerous works ever published was his Sheëlot u-Teshubot (Questions and Answers), responsa, Venice, 1663; but the Amsterdam edition of the rabbinical Tanakh (1724–28) contains notes by Berab on Isaiah and Jeremiah.

References

 Its bibliography:
Azulai, Shem ha-Gedolim, ed. Wilna, i. 86;
David Conforte, Ḳore ha-Dorot, see Index in ed. Cassel;
Frumkin, Eben Yerushalaim, pp. 34–40, Wilna, 1874;
Fuenn, in Ha-Karmel, ii. 486–494, 576–580;
idem, Keneset Yisrael, pp. 539, 540;
Heinrich Grätz, Gesch. der Juden, 3d ed., ix. 12, 200–298;
Jost, Gesch. des Judenthums und Seiner Sekten, iii. 128, 129;
Michael, Or ha-Ḥayyim, p. 1069;
Moritz Steinschneider, Cat. Bodl. col. 1194;
Joseph Zedner, Cat. Hebr. Books Brit. Mus. p. 307;
Zunz, Z. G. pp. 250, 531.
The most important source of information for the dispute about ordination is Levi ben Jacob ibn Ḥabib, Responsa, pp. 277a, 328a, Venice, 1565;
S. P. Rabbinowitz, Mozaëi Golah, see Index.

External links
 Short biography of Rabbi Jacob Berab

1474 births
1546 deaths
15th-century Castilian Jews
16th-century Moroccan rabbis
Rabbis in Safed
Sephardi rabbis in Ottoman Palestine
Jews expelled from Spain in 1492
Sephardi Jews in Ottoman Palestine
16th-century rabbis from the Ottoman Empire